Manégtaba-Mossi  is a town in the Tikare Department of Bam Province in northern Burkina Faso. It has a population of 2227.

References

Populated places in the Centre-Nord Region
Bam Province